Clarence E. Wagner was Mayor of Long Beach, California.

Biography
Wagner was born on September 6, 1896, in Antigo, Wisconsin, and was of German ancestry. He died on July 26, 1979.

Career
Wagner served twice as Mayor of Long Beach from 1938 to 1939, and subsequently from 1942 to 1945.

References

1896 births
1979 deaths
American people of German descent
Mayors of Long Beach, California
People from Antigo, Wisconsin
20th-century American politicians